Veselin Branimirov Atanasov (Bulgarian: Веселин Бранимиров Атанасов; born 25 August 1975 in Varna) is a Bulgarian  football coach and a former defender who is currently manager. He has 3 caps at international level for the Bulgarian national team.

Career
In his club career, Veselin Branimirov played for Cherno More Varna (1994–95), Neftochimic Burgas (1995-05 and 2006) and Kazakhstani side Tobol (2005). In January 2007, at the age of 31, he retired from football because of a waist injury.

Coaching career
On 27 September 2017, Branimirov was appointed as manager of Second League club Pomorie. Between 5 July 2018 and 5 February 2019 he was senior assistant coach of Viktor Skrypnyk in Latvian side Riga FC and won a double - champion of Latvian Higher League and a Latvian Cup winner for 2018 - first time in the history of the club. On 3 June 2019 he followed Skrypnyk on his new appointment with Ukrainian FC Zorya Luhansk. They finished third in 2019–20 Ukrainian Premier League and qualified for 2020–21 UEFA Europa League group stage.

Managerial statistics

Club Playing Honours
Neftochimic Burgas
 A PFG: runner-up 1996–97
 Bulgarian Cup: runner-up 2000

References

External links
 

1975 births
Living people
Sportspeople from Varna, Bulgaria
Bulgarian footballers
Bulgaria under-21 international footballers
Bulgaria international footballers
PFC Cherno More Varna players
Neftochimic Burgas players
FC Tobol players
First Professional Football League (Bulgaria) players
Kazakhstan Premier League players
Bulgarian expatriate footballers
Bulgarian expatriate sportspeople in Kazakhstan
Expatriate footballers in Kazakhstan
Association football defenders
Bulgarian football managers
Bulgarian expatriate football managers
Expatriate football managers in Ukraine
Bulgarian expatriate sportspeople in Ukraine